Jill S. Balser is a Canadian politician, who was elected to the Nova Scotia House of Assembly in the 2021 Nova Scotia general election. She represents the riding of Digby-Annapolis as a member of the Progressive Conservative Association of Nova Scotia.

She is the daughter of Gordon Balser, who represented the same district from 1998 to 2003.

On August 31, 2021, Balser was made Minister of Labor, Skills, and Immigration, as well as Minister responsible for Apprenticeship.

Electoral record

References

Year of birth missing (living people)
Living people
Progressive Conservative Association of Nova Scotia MLAs
Women MLAs in Nova Scotia
21st-century Canadian politicians
21st-century Canadian women politicians